Pseudomusonia lineativentris is a species of praying mantis native to Costa Rica, Colombia, and Panama.

See also
List of mantis genera and species

References

Mantidae
Mantodea of South America
Arthropods of Colombia
Insects described in 1877